"Somebody's Knockin" is a song recorded by American country music singer Terri Gibbs. It was released in October 1980 as her debut single and title track from her album  Somebody's Knockin.  It was co-written by Jerry Gillespie and Ed Penney.  Penney was a record company executive who liked Gibbs's voice when he first heard her audition tape, but felt she needed stronger material.  Penney was a former Boston disc jockey who had promoted records and written a number of songs before moving to Nashville.  He was the producer of "Somebody's Knockin'" and became Terri Gibbs's manager.

Critical reception
An uncredited review in Billboard praised Gibbs' "unusual vocal sound" and the "Louisiana-flavored production".

The song's success led to Gibbs winning the 1981 Academy of Country Music Top Female Vocalist award, and the first Horizon (now New Artist) Award from the Country Music Association.

It was also nominated for a Grammy Award for Best Country Song.

Chart performance

See also
List of 1980s one-hit wonders in the United States

References

External links
 Lyrics of this song
 

Terri Gibbs songs
1980 debut singles
MCA Nashville Records singles
Songs written by Jerry Gillespie
1980 songs